is a retired Japanese long-distance runner who competed in the men's 5000 metres at the 1964 Summer Olympics.

References

External links
 

1941 births
Living people
Place of birth missing (living people)
Japanese male middle-distance runners
Japanese male long-distance runners
Olympic male long-distance runners
Olympic athletes of Japan
Athletes (track and field) at the 1964 Summer Olympics
Asian Games bronze medalists for Japan
Asian Games medalists in athletics (track and field)
Athletes (track and field) at the 1962 Asian Games
Athletes (track and field) at the 1966 Asian Games
Medalists at the 1962 Asian Games
Medalists at the 1966 Asian Games
Japan Championships in Athletics winners
20th-century Japanese people
21st-century Japanese people